Factory Island 1 is a Cree First Nations reserve on Moose Factory Island in northern Ontario. It is one of two reserves for the Moose Cree First Nation.

Land use
The northern two-thirds of the island comprises this reserve or land north of Museum Street. Most residential, the reserve is home to a Northern Store, Cree Interpretative Centre and Treeline Diner. Key government services, including hospital, are located in the southern part of the island under the Unorganized North Cochrane District.

Half of the reserve, namely the north end is tree covered land.

Transportation

Gravel road are used for vehicles within town. There no bridges, but a ice road is available during the winter season.

References

Cree reserves in Ontario
Communities in Cochrane District